is a passenger railway station located in the town of Minami, Kaifu District, Tokushima Prefecture, Japan. It is operated by JR Shikoku and has the station number "M19".

Lines
Only local trains stop at the station.

Layout
The station consists of one side platform serving a single track on an embankment. There is no station building, only a shelter on the platform for passengers. A ramp and a flight of steps lead up to the platform from the access road. Near the base of the ramp is a disused shelter that once housed a ticket window.

Adjacent stations

History
On 1 April 1987, with the privatization of Japanese National Railways (JNR), the successor of JGR, JR Shikoku took over control of the station.

Surrounding area
Kiki is a settlement centered on the fishing industry, and private houses are gathered on the narrow flat land at the mouth of the Kiki River.
Kiki Fisheries Cooperative
Minami Municipal Kiki Elementary School
Minami Municipal Kiki Public Hall

See also
 List of Railway Stations in Japan

References

External links

 JR Shikoku timetable 

Railway stations in Tokushima Prefecture
Railway stations in Japan opened in 1939
Minami, Tokushima